Justus Pfaue (25 September 1942 – 8 March 2014) was a German author and screenwriter.

Biography
Pfaue was born in Ballenstedt as Norbert Sellmann.  He studied law and forensic psychology. In 1965, he published his first novel, and later specialized in books on youth. He lived in Munich and Positano.

Works

Novels
 1985: Bas-Boris Bode
 1986: Devil's grandmother, or the heaven on earth
 1987: Anna
 1988: Anna Ballerina
 1989: Bravo, Anna
 1989: Laura and Luis

Screenplays
 1979: Timm Thaler (TV series, based on the eponymous novel)
 1980: Merlin (TV series about Merlin)
 1981: Sternensommer (TV series)
 1981: Manni, der Libero (TV series)
 1981: Silas (TV series, based on a novel by Cecil Bødker)
 1982: Jack Holborn (TV series, based on a novel by Leon Garfield)
 1983: Mandara (TV series)
 1983: Nesthäkchen (TV series, besed on the novels by Else Ury)
 1984: Two Black Sheep (TV series)
 1984: Patrik Pacard (TV series)
 1985: Bas-Boris Bode (TV series)
 1985: Oliver Maass (TV series)
 1986: Teufels Großmutter (TV series)
 1986-1991: Die Wicherts von nebenan (TV series)
 1987: Anna (TV series)
 1989: Laura und Luis (TV series)
 1993: Clara (TV miniseries)
 1994: Blankenese (TV series)
 2004:  (TV miniseries)
 2009: Hand in Hand (TV series)

Awards and honors
 2005 Golden Romy for Best Screenplay for The Cherry Queen

References

External links

1942 births
2014 deaths
German children's writers
German male writers
Male television writers
German television writers
German screenwriters
German male screenwriters
People from Ballenstedt
Mass media people from Saxony-Anhalt